Brooks is a  mixed-use community in the southeast portion of the city of San Antonio, Texas, United States. Brooks was created in 2001 by the United States Congress, the State of Texas and the City of San Antonio to redevelop the former Brooks Air Force Base. Brooks is intended to be a catalyst for economic development, a dynamic mixed-use community and a model for responsible urban planning and development.

Brooks is home to nearly 40 businesses that employ almost 3,000 people at an average salary of $50,000.

Land use
The Brooks land use plan applies a clear strategy of land development and resource allocation that achieves a stronger economy and a more unified community. The plan includes a mix of residential, light-industrial, health, office, commercial and retail developments, along with designated parks and green space.

The land use plan breaks the 1,308-acre campus into three districts, each with a unique purpose and character that creates a balance between culture, economy, and ecology. Combined, the three districts offer space for multiple uses and redevelopment.

Development
The Brooks Development Authority has demonstrated economic development success with projects including a 62-acre (250,000 m2) retail development, approximately 256,000 square feet (23,800 m2) of research and distribution facilities for DPT Laboratories, an international pharmaceutical company, and a $25.5 million City/County emergency operations center which opened in the Fall 2007.

In 2012, the $90 million Mission Trail Baptist Hospital opened; in September 2014, Mission Solar Energy, opened a 240,000 square-foot manufacturing facility employing more than 400 people in San Antonio. The University of the Incarnate Word opened a School of Osteopathic Medicine in July 2017.

In May 2017, Embassy Suites Hotel & Spa by Hilton opened a location at Brooks, with 156-suites and about 13,000 square-feet of event and meeting space. Earlier in the year, Brooks completed their renovation of a historic airplane hangar. Hangar 9 is the oldest wooden airplane hangar in its original spot. It is now used as an event venue. The Greenline, a 43-acre linear park connecting to the San Antonio River Mission Reach, opened at Brooks in the spring of 2018.

In Spring 2018, Japanese manufacturing company, Nissei Plastics Industrial Co., Ltd. opened a $13 million plant at Brooks, providing over 50 jobs.

Three local restaurants will soon open their doors at Brooks. Chef Johnny Hernandez will open La Gloria and El Machito off of Southeast Military Drive and Kennedy Hill Drive. Chef Jeff Balfour's Southerleigh restaurant is currently under construction at the heart of The Greenline park as well as a brewery project located off of Sidney Brooks east of South New Braunfels Ave. 

Breaking ground in Spring 2019, Cuisine Solutions is currently under construction with a projected 2021 completion date. 

In Summer 2019, City Base Commons, a retail development of more than 54,000 square feet, opened on the Brooks campus. Tenants include Raising Cane's, Smoothie King, Deco Pizzeria and LA Crawfish.

Residential
There are a wide range of living options at Brooks, from apartments to single-family homes. Each apartment complex or neighborhood has a rich history, with renovations that have kept it up-to-date with modern times. The Aviator apartments were repurposed from former Air Force barracks, while The Kennedy uses murals to commemorate President John F. Kennedy's visit to Brooks in 1963. Brooks has announced construction on a new single-family home development.

Education
Residents are zoned to the San Antonio Independent School District or East Central Independent School District.

The community includes STEM-based (Science, Technology, Engineering and Mathematics) K–12 school, Brooks Academy of Science and Engineering, and Compass Rose Academy, a 6-12 public charter school. Brooks also offers higher education with the University of Incarnate Word School of Osteopathic Medicine, which opened July 2017. The first class at CAST Med, a healthcare magnet high school, began in Fall 2019.

Historic Hangar 9 
Brooks started construction, in March 2016, on a rehabilitation and restoration project of the historic Hangar 9 building, built in 1918. The building is the oldest wooden aircraft hangar of its kind still standing in its original location. Hangar 9 is a San Antonio Historic Landmark, listed in the Texas State Historical Survey, the National Register of Historic Places, and is a National Historic Landmark. The $2.8 million project took approximately one year to complete. The work provided foundation and structural repairs, electrical upgrades, installation of new windows and doors, painting and siding replacement, new paving and landscaping, and accessibility improvements. The nearly 8,000 square-feet building is available for use to the public for community and business events and special gatherings.

History
Brooks is a former United States Air Force facility, located in San Antonio, Texas. The Air Force ceased military operations on 30 September 2011.

Following the 1995 Base Realignment and Closure (BRAC), when Brooks AFB was removed from the BRAC list, city, state, military, and community planners began to develop a plan to privatize and approved the gradual transition in ownership of Brooks AFB from the Air Force to the Brooks Development Authority. This transition came into full effect on Jul. 22, 2002, when the Brooks Development Authority assumed control of the newly named Brooks City Base. The Air Force was the largest tenant at Brooks City Base.
In 2002, Brooks Air Force Base was renamed Brooks City Base when the property was conveyed to the Brooks Development Authority as part of a unique project between local, state, and federal government.  The Brooks Development Authority is now the owner and operator of the property, and is redeveloping it as a dynamic multi-use community.

In 2017, Brooks City Base changed its name to Brooks to make it clearer that it is no longer a military base. Brooks also wanted to communicate that it is an open community where people can build businesses, live in residential areas, and visit nearby retail and dining facilities.

Namesake
Brooks Air Force Base was named to honor San Antonio aviator Sidney Johnson Brooks, Jr. Cadet Brooks died on 13 November 1917 when his Curtiss JN-4 nosed down as he prepared to land after his final training flight at Kelly Field, Texas, possibly because he had blacked out in reaction to the inoculations they had been given shortly before the flight. Brooks was one of the first to volunteer at the call for men for the American Flying Corps; he was about to complete his training for a commission as a military aviator. He was awarded his wings and commission posthumously.

Names
 Gosport Field, prior to 5 December 1917
 Signal Corps Aviation School, Kelly Field #5, 5 December 1917
 Brooks Field, 4 February 1918
 Brooks Air Force Base, 24 June 1948
 Brooks (City-Base), 22 July 2002 – 30 September 2011
 Brooks City Base, 30 September 2011 – 1 June 2017
 Brooks, 1 June 2017 – Present

References

External links
 
 Google Map of Brooks
 City of San Antonio

Neighborhoods in San Antonio